The 1957 NHL Intraleague Draft was held on June 5, 1957.

Selections by round
Below are listed the selections in the 1957 NHL Intraleague draft.

Round one

See also
 1957–58 NHL season
 List of NHL players

References

External links
 1957 NHL Intraleague Draft player stats at The Internet Hockey Database

Draft